is a passenger railway station located in the city of  Yokosuka, Kanagawa Prefecture, Japan, operated by the private railway company Keikyū.

Lines
Anjinzuka Station is served by the Keikyū Main Line and is located 47.2 kilometers from the northern terminus of the line at Shinagawa Station in Tokyo.

Station layout
The station consists of two opposed elevated side platforms with the station building underneath.

Platforms

History
The station was renamed Anjinzuka on October 1, 1940. The station building was rebuilt in 2007.

Keikyū introduced station numbering to its stations on 21 October 2010; Anjinzuka Station was assigned station number KK56.

Passenger statistics
In fiscal 2019, the station was used by an average of 4,671 passengers daily.

The passenger figures for previous years are as shown below.

Surrounding area
 Yokosuka City Nagaura Elementary School
 Tomb of William Adams (pilot)

See also
 List of railway stations in Japan

References

External links

 

Railway stations in Kanagawa Prefecture
Railway stations in Japan opened in 1934
Keikyū Main Line
Railway stations in Yokosuka, Kanagawa